The Kharoti (Pashto: خروټی) are a Pashtun tribe of Ghilji origin, originating in the central part of Paktika Province, Afghanistan, but can be also found in other parts of the country. The Kharoti settled in Kharotabad in Quetta, British India (now Pakistan) around 1945.  

The Kharoti in Afghanistan and have an estimated population of about 2.5 million, making them one of the largest tribes in Afghanistan and Pakistan. The Kharoti own significant territory throughout eastern and southeastern Afghanistan. Many Kharoti are business owners.

There are large Kharoti populations in the Paktika districts of Urgun, Barmal, Sar Hawza, Zarghun Shahr, Omna, Surobi, Ghazni, Zabul, Paktia, Khost, Logar, Wardak, Kabul, Nangarhar, Helmand and Gomal. The Kharoti also have a significant presence in the Pakistani province of Balochistan and Khyber Pakhtunkhwa. Sher Khan Bandar, Afghanistan's largest harbour city, which is located near Tajikistan's border, is named after Sher Khan Nashir, Khan of the Kharoti. Around 2000 Kharoti families also live in the Iranian cities of Zahedan and Karimabad. They typically speak Persian and Balochi languages. 

In Pakistan, Kharoti live in the Chaghi District of Balochistan and typically speak in the Balochi tongue. They also live in Noushki, Balochistan. The Kharoti also live in Chamalang near Loralai and call themselves Kharotani, but nevertheless speak Balochi. The Kharoti tribe has a presence in the Khyber Pakhtunkhwa province in Dera Ismail Khan, Bannu (Ghoriwala) and Lakki Marwat village Adamzai. The Kharoti families are also living in district Zhob Balochistan having a population of 500 families. The Zhob kharoti head  Malak Haji Gul khan Kharoti.

Significance
As Pashtuns of the Ghilji confederacy, the heyday of the Kharotis was during the peak of the khans of the Nasher-Nashir family. With the rise of the rival Durrani confederacy in the 18th century, the Kharoti lost their leading role in Afghan politics but remained strong in rural Afghan regions. However, they often view themselves as the "true Pashtuns" and, being Ghilji, as the rightful leaders of Afghanistan.

Notable Kharoti

Gulbuddin Hekmatyar, Politician, Afghan warfare leader during soviet union occupation, ( Hizb-e-Islami Chairman) and former Prime minister
Sher Khan Nasher, Loe Khan (Grand Khan) founder of Spinzar Cotton Company and founding father of Kunduz
Gholam Serwar Nasher, Khan (1922–1984), president of Spinzar 
Cotton Company
Dr. Ahmad Shah Kharoti, general director of finance and administration of MOPH Afghanistan  and elder of Kharoti tribe.     
Gholam Nabi Nasher, Khan (1926–2010), parliamentarian 
Hafizullah Amin, politician and president of Afghanistan
Haji merajuddin Khan Kharoti former justice minister of Afghanistan and elder of Kharoti tribe.
Sahib Jan Khan, politician and a former Kharoti tribe leader in Paktika, Afghanistan
Sardar Akbar Khan Kharoti, namesake of Sardar Akbar Kharoti Road in Quetta, Pakistan
Arsala Kharoti, A renowned Commander during the soviet invasion Afghanistan, Chairman of Afghan refugees in Pakistan since 2016.
Malak khan Mohammad Khaki, the son of Malak Agha Mohammad Abbaskhil from Sarobi Paktika, he was Senator from 2004 to 2010 The House of Elders or Mesherano Jirga (Pashto/Dari: مشرانو جرگه یا خانه کهن سالان), is the upper house of the bicameral National Assembly of Afghanistan,
Farhad Darya Nasher, Khan (born 1962), singer and composer                                          
Mirwais Ashraf, Afghanistan national cricket team player
Sharafuddin Ashraf, Afghanistan National Cricket Team player
Haji Ghani Kharoti Pakistan, Loralai Katwai, leader of a Kharoti family in Loralai Pakistan who came from Helmand, Afghanistan

Ahad Khan Zada Kharoti Pakistan Qila Saifulla, leader Of the Kharoti Tribe Qila Saifullah in Balochistan, Pakistan
Haji Mohammad Akber kharoti, leader of the Amandkhel tribe of Kharoti
Malak Sultan Muhammad Mehmood Khel Kharoti
Muhammad Nazir Kharoti, Governor of Urozgan (2015-2018)
Molowe Arsalan Rahmani Paktika Afghanistan, member of Sana (Mashrano Jarga) and director of the Afghan peace committee
Sardar Akbar Khan Mehmood Khel Kharoti Kanobi Aghbarg Loralai
Haji Niaz Muhammad Amiri, Ghazni, Afghanistan, member of parliament in 2006 and Governor of Logar province
Bayazid Khan kharoti
Khalid Farooqi.Former Member of Parliament and advisor of President Ashraf Ghani

See also
Urgun
Angur Ada
Loya Paktia
Ghoriwala

References

Ghilji Pashtun tribes
Pashto-language surnames
Pakistani names